Trate is a settlement in the Slovene Hills in the Municipality of Šentilj in northeastern Slovenia.

Cmurek Castle is an originally 12th-century castle built on a hill above the Mura River in the northern part of the settlement. It was extended and rebuilt at various times in the 16th, 17th, and late 18th centuries. It is a three-story building with an internal arcaded courtyard.

References

External links
Trate on Geopedia

Populated places in the Municipality of Šentilj